Chris Owen may refer to:

Chris Owen (actor) (born 1980), American actor 
Chris Owen (cricketer) (born 1963), Australian cricketer
Chris Owen (director) (born 1944), Australian filmmaker

See also 

Chris Owens (disambiguation)